{{DISPLAYTITLE:C26H28ClNO}}
The molecular formula C26H28ClNO (molar mass: 405.96 g/mol, exact mass: 405.1859 u) may refer to:

 Clomifene, or clomiphene
 Enclomifene, or enclomiphene
 Toremifene
 Zuclomifene, or zuclomiphene